Live at the Wireless is a radio show, and now a long-standing tradition, of Triple J, an Australian radio station. Live music is one of the central philosophies of the station.

The live broadcasts take a number of forms. Some broadcasts are from open-air concerts and festivals, or smaller pub gigs around the country. Many are bands that have been invited into the Triple J studios to play a live set of tracks, usually acoustic. Occasionally, Triple J will give away tickets to listeners, to allow them to be a part of a special live performance in a secret location.

All of the live broadcasts are recorded, and the station has released several double-CD compilations of live tracks. Many complete live sets are traded by music fans worldwide over the internet.

Live music is not exclusive to the Live at the Wireless segment - many other shows, including the specialty music shows, also have bands playing acoustic in the studio.

Ash have released their Live at the Wireless set from 1996 as an album - see Live at the Wireless (Ash album).

Live At The Wireless 1
Recorded by the Triple team, compiled and released in 1983 was Triple J - Live At The Wireless 1

Private Lives - "Pleas"
The Particles - ("Bits Of) Wood"
Samurai Trash - "Samurai Stomp"
The Go-Betweens - "Hammer the Hammer"
The Triffids - "My Baby Thinks She's a Train"
Second Language - "Random Men"
Do-Re-Mi - "Bring the Hammer Down"
Dropbears - "Lay Him Down"
Soggy Porridge - "You've Changed"
Hoodoo Gurus - "Dig It Up"
Idiom Flesh - "Ritual"

Live At The Wireless 2

Recorded by the Triple team, compiled and released in 1991 was Triple J - Live At The Wireless 2

Killing Time- Holy Juice
Ratcat - Skin
Violent Femmes - Kiss Off
Louis Tillett- Long Walk Home
Concrete Blonde - Make Me Cry
Faith No More - Falling to Pieces
Nick Barker & The Reptiles- Miles To Go
Pop Will Eat Itself- Def. Con. One
Beasts Of Bourbon- Bad Revisited
Falling Joys- Puppy Drink
Andy Prieboy- Tomorrow Wendy
Not Drowning, Waving- Albert Namatjira
Archie Roach - Charcoal Lane
The Welcome Mat- Cake
Mudhoney- Touch Me I'm Sick
Straitjacket Fits - Such A Daze
The Blackeyed Susans- Glory Glory
Melanie Oxley & Chris Abrahams - Benchtop
Henry Rollins- I Know You

Live At The Wireless 3
Recorded by the Triple team, compiled and released in 1993 was Triple J - Live At The Wireless 3

DEF Rhyme - Sex Be High
Underground Lovers - Promenade
Matthew Sweet - Devil With the Green Eyes
The Truth- My Heavy Friend
Lucinda Williams- Changed The Locks
Throwing Muses - Firepile
Things of Stone and Wood - Share This Wine
Skunkhour - Bootyfull
Tumbleweed- Sundial
Headless Chickens - Juice
Belly - Dusted
DIG- Reinvent Yourself
The Badloves - I Remember
The Sharp- Train Of Thought
Screaming Jets - Here I Go
The Plums - Ride
Chris Wilson- The Big One
Faith No More - Midlife Crisis

References

External links
Live at the Wireless

Triple J programs